Nepal Red Cross Society (NRCS) is an independent, volunteer-based and nonprofit-humanitarian organization that delivers humanitarian service and support to the vulnerable people in an impartial and neutral manner. It came into being on 4 September 1963.
Nepal Red Cross Society was officially registered in Nepal after Nepal Government acceded to the Geneva Conventions (12 August 1949). Having been recognized by the International Committee of the Red Cross (ICRC) and affiliated to International Federation of Red Cross and Red Crescent Societies (IFRC) on 1 October 1964.

NRCS has, over the years, grown to be the largest humanitarian organization in Nepal, with its network of District Chapters (DCs) extended in each of the 77 districts of the country. District Chapters receive organizational support from more than 1,508 Sub-Chapters, 5,410 Junior and 865 Youth Red Cross Circles and Co-operation Committees under them. In addition, NRCS has been providing its services from 2 eye hospital, extended eye care centres, 113 blood transfusion centers, 210 ambulance service stations and 12 warehouses within the country.

History
Nearly after 100 years of establishment of red cross in the world. By observing the need of establishment of the Red Cross in Nepal, in the chairmanship of then Health Minister Dr. Nageshwar Prasad Singh a meeting was called at Singha Durbar, after Nepal Government acceded to the Geneva Conventions. Nepal Red Cross Society came into being on 4 September 1963. Princess Princep Shah of Nepal helped found the Nepal Red Cross and was its first President.

Chairpersons
 Princess Princep Shah
 Princess Helen Shah of Nepal
 Mr. Ramesh Kumar Sharma
 Mr. Sanjiv Thapa
 Prof Dr. Bishwa Keshar Maskay
 Mr. Sanjiv Thapa
 Dr. Netra Prasad Timsina 
 Prof Mr. Sudarshan Pd. Nepal

Organizational structure
Nepal Red Cross Society (NRCS) has District Chapters (DC) in each district of the country. Which receives organizational support from Sub-Chapters, Youth/Junior Red Cross Circles and Co-operation Committees under them.
National Assembly    → Central Executive Committee
Provincial Assembly  → Provincial Committee
District Assembly    → District Executive Committee
Sub-Chapter Assembly → Sub-Chapter Executive Committee

National Committees
 National Disaster & Crisis Management Committee
 National Health & Community Resilience Committee
 National Humanitarian Principles & Diplomacy Committee
 National Organization & Capacity Development Committee
Central Committees provide guidance to bringing effectiveness in programme having National Network.

Central Committees
 Central Junior/Youth RC Committee
 Central Health Service Committee
 Central Community Development Committee
 Central Finance Development Committee
 Central Gender & Inclusion Committee
 Central Blood Transfusion Management Committee
There are five regional committees and other committees related to management and technical areas. District chapter and sub-chapter have separate committees working in local level.

Provincial Coordination Committees
Nepal Red Cross Society has 7 Provincial Coordination Committees in each 7 Provinces.
Province 1
Madhesh Province
Bagmati Province
Gandaki Province
Lumbini Province
Karnali Province
Sudurpaschim Province

Provincial Level Assembly
The first provincial assembly elections in Nepal was held in two phases, on 26 November 2017 and on 7 December 2017. As the government changed its structure through the constitution of Nepal. Nepal Red Cross Society also needed to change its structure as per the government's setup. Thus, NRCS reformed its statute on 47th General Convention of the central assembly held at Biratnagar. As per the new statue NRCS has changed its structure into four levels – local, district, provincial and central levels.

District Level Committees
Nepal Red Cross Society has district chapters in all 77 districts of the country. These district chapters receive organizational support from Sub-Chapters at local level, Junior/ Youth Red Cross Circles in district level and coordinating committees under them.

Sub-Chapter Level Committees
Sub-Chapters are the local level committees reaching every ward of the district. The working area of sub-chapters are divided into various wards of the Village / Municipality / Metropolitan City. These sub-chapters receives organizational support from Junior/ Youth Red Cross Circles based on schools and coordinating committees at communities.

Structure
NRCS has District Chapters in all 77 district within the country, and more than 1,508 Sub-Chapters.

Koshi Pradesh

Madhesh Province

Bagmati (Province No. 3)

Gandaki Pradesh (Province No. 4)

Lumbini Province

Karnali Pradesh (Province No. 6)

Sudurpashchim Pradesh (Province No. 7)

Blood Service
Blood Transfusion Service of Nepal Red Cross Society was established in the year 1966, three years after the inception of the Society itself. The government of Nepal, in its policy declaration of 1991, has mandated Nepal Red Cross Society as the sole authority in conducting blood programmes in Nepal.

Central level
The Central Blood Transfusion Service Center (CBTSC) in Kathmandu is responsible for management of services in the Kathmandu valley, and for supervising and monitoring the technical standards of the district centers, providing guidance to ensure the collection and supply of safe blood.

Regional level
Five regions have blood transfusion service centers at Biratnagar, Chitwan, Pokhra, Nepalganj and Dhangadhi. Those provide local services, and thus there is no distinct functioning management structure at the regional level.

District level
The district BTSCs are managed by NRCS district chapters. These centres are supposed to comply with guidelines provided under the 1983 NRCS regulations and the 1998 Standard Operating Procedures.

Emergency Blood Transfusion center
BTSCs that provides emergency transfusion are classified under it. Emergency BTSCs have no storage facilities, but keep a list of donors who can be called upon to donate blood in an emergency. They provide basic cross-matching and testing services.

Hospital Unit
BTSCs established by Governmental or Private Hospitals/ Institutions are classified under this unit.

Structure

Eye Hospital
Nepal Red Cross Society has been managing eye care services as a key component of health service in Mid-West Region (Karnali Province) since 1990s through eye care centers (Surkhet, Dailekh, Jajarkot and Bardia) and outreach program with the support of Swiss Red Cross. NRCS operates two eye hospitals and extended eye care centers within the country.

Training Center
The Nepal Red Cross Society has its National Training Center, Human Resource Development Institute (HRDI) at Budol, Banepa, Kavre, Nepal.

References

External links
Nepal Red Cross Society Website
ICRC

Red Cross and Red Crescent national societies
1963 establishments in Nepal
Organizations established in 1963
Medical and health organisations based in Nepal